Hisham Mohammed Osman Bastawisy (23 May 1951 – 17 April 2021) was an Egyptian judge and the vice president of the Egyptian Court of Cassation. He was one of the leaders of the Egyptian opposition before and during the 2011 Egyptian revolution. He ran for the office of president during the 2012 elections as a Tagammu nominee.

He died on 17 April 2021, aged 69.

References

1952 births
2021 deaths
Cairo University alumni
Judges from Cairo
National Progressive Unionist Party politicians
People of the Egyptian revolution of 2011